Wang Quan (born 15 February 1989) is a Chinese footballer.

Club career
Wang Quan started his professional football career in 2007 for third tier football club Hangzhou Sanchao, a football club formed from the youth team of Zhejiang Greentown. After three seasons with Hangzhou Sanchao he was brought back to Zhejiang Green Town, now renamed Hangzhou Greentown for the 2010 Chinese Super League campaign. On 16 October 2011, he made his debut for Hangzhou in the 2011 Chinese Super League against Jiangsu Sainty.
 
In March 2012, Wang moved to China League Two club Hubei China-Kyle.
In March 2013, he transferred to China League Two side Hebei Zhongji. He would go on to establish himself as a squad player that went on to gain successive promotions Hebei Zhongji as they reached the top tier. In March 2017, Wang transferred to League Two side Hunan Billows.

Career statistics 
Statistics accurate as of match played 31 December 2020.

References

External links

1989 births
Living people
Chinese footballers
Footballers from Wuhan
Zhejiang Professional F.C. players
Xinjiang Tianshan Leopard F.C. players
Hebei F.C. players
Hunan Billows players
Chinese Super League players
China League One players
Association football midfielders
21st-century Chinese people